Greg Primus (born October 20, 1970) is a former American football player for the Chicago Bears of the National Football League (NFL).  Primus attended George Washington High School in Denver as well as Colorado State University.

External links
Just Sports Stats

1970 births
American football wide receivers
Denver Broncos players
Chicago Bears players
Colorado State Rams football players
Living people
Players of American football from Denver